Roosen is a Dutch surname. It is either of matronymic origin (Roos' son) or refer to a rose or roses. Among variant forms are Roose, Rooze or Roozen. Notable people with the surname include:

 (born 1958), Dutch actress and playwright
Carl Roosen (1800–1880), Norwegian cartographer and military officer
Hyacinthe Roosen 1897–?), Belgian free style wrestler
Luc Roosen (born 1964), Belgian cyclist
 (1901–1980), German mechanical engineer
Timo Roosen (born 1993), Dutch cyclist
Roozen
Annette Roozen (born 1976), Dutch paraplegic track and field athlete
Nico Roozen (born 1953), Dutch economist, co-founder of the first Fairtrade certification initiative
Rooze
Rene Rooze (born 1969), Dutch kickboxer

References

Dutch-language surnames
Matronymic surnames

de:Roosen
fr:Roosen